Joshua Khiry Malone (born March 21, 1996) is an American football wide receiver. He played college football for the Tennessee Volunteers. He played for the Cincinnati Bengals and New York Jets of the National Football League (NFL) and DC Defenders of the XFL.

Early years
Malone attended Station Camp High School in Gallatin, Tennessee, where he played high school football for the Bison. He had a successful high school career at Station Camp. As a junior in 2012, he had 28 receptions for 408 yards and five touchdowns. In addition, he had 15 rushes for 101 yards and a rushing touchdown. He had numerous accomplishments during his senior season in 2013. He had 71 receptions for 1,404 yards and 19 receiving touchdowns and 23 rushes for 227 yards and three rushing touchdowns during his senior season. His successful senior season warranted an invitation to play in the 2014 U.S. Army All-American Game.

College career
Before the 2014 college football season, Malone committed to play for the University of Tennessee under head coach Butch Jones.

2014 season
In 2014, as a true freshman, Malone played in all 12 regular season games and the 2015 TaxSlayer Bowl against Iowa. He made his collegiate debut against Utah State on August 31 at Neyland Stadium. In his collegiate debut, he had two receptions for 26 yards. Against SEC East rival Georgia on September 27, he had five receptions for 43 yards and a 20-yard rush in the loss at Sanford Stadium. Against Ole Miss, he had a season-high 75 yards on five receptions at Vaught-Hemingway Stadium. He had his first career touchdown against Alabama in their annual rivalry game on October 25 at home. In the 2014 season, Malone had 23 receptions for 201 yards and a touchdown.

2015 season
In his sophomore season in 2015, Malone played in all 12 regular season games and the 2016 Outback Bowl against Northwestern. He started twelve games for the Volunteers. In the home opener, Malone had his first touchdown of the season in a 2OT loss to the Oklahoma Sooners. On October 10, he led the Vols in catches in their upset 38–31 victory over #19 Georgia at Neyland Stadium. He had his first career game with over 100 receiving yards at Kentucky at Commonwealth Stadium. In the game, he had a career-long 75-yard touchdown reception from quarterback Joshua Dobbs. He finished third on the team with 31 catches for 405 yards and two touchdowns.

2016 season
In his junior season in 2016, Malone appeared in all 12 regular season games and the bowl game. He had a 67-yard receiving touchdown in the season opening 20–13 overtime victory against Appalachian State on September 1. In the 2016 Pilot Flying J Battle at Bristol against Virginia Tech, he had two receptions for 46 yards and a touchdown. Against the Ohio Bobcats the following week, he had five receptions for 69 yards and two touchdowns.  He had four catches for 91 yards and a 42-yard touchdown in the 38–28 win against SEC East Rival Florida on September 24. On November 5, against the Tennessee Tech Golden Eagles, he had five receptions for 112 yards and two touchdowns. He had a career-high 121 receiving yards and one touchdown at Vanderbilt on November 26. In his final game with the Volunteers, he had five receptions for 120 yards and one touchdown in the 2016 Music City Bowl victory over Nebraska on December 30. In the 2016 season, he finished third in the SEC in receiving yards and touchdowns, with 972 and 11, respectively.

After the 2016 season, Malone declared his intentions to enter the 2017 NFL Draft.

College statistics

Professional career 
Coming out of Tennessee, Malone was projected to be a third round pick by the majority of NFL draft experts and scouts. He received an invitation to the NFL combine and completed all of the required combine and positional drills. On March 31, 2017, Malone participated at Tennessee's pro day, along with Joshua Dobbs, Alvin Kamara, Cameron Sutton, Jalen Reeves-Maybin, Derek Barnett, Jason Croom, former Saint's wide receiver Robert Meachem, and 17 other prospects. Around 100 scouts and team representatives from all 32 NFL teams attended, including Pittsburgh Steelers' head coach Mike Tomlin, as Malone performed all of the combine and positional drills. He was ranked the 12th best wide receiver prospect in the draft by NFLDraftScout.com.

Cincinnati Bengals
The Cincinnati Bengals selected Malone in the fourth round (128th overall) of the 2017 NFL Draft. He was the 18th wide receiver and the fifth of six Tennessee Volunteers to be selected in the 2017 NFL Draft.

On May 17, 2017, the Cincinnati Bengals signed Malone to a four-year, $2.99 million contract with a signing bonus of $599,241.

He joined a deep wide receiver group with the Bengals and competed with John Ross, Brandon LaFell, Tyler Boyd, and Cody Core throughout training camp for a job as the starting wide receiver. Head coach Marvin Lewis named Malone the fifth wide receiver on the Bengals' depth chart behind A. J. Green, Brandon LaFell, Cody Core, and Tyler Boyd.

Although Malone was healthy, he was inactive for the first five games of the  season. On October 22, 2017, he made his professional regular season debut during a 29–14 loss to the Pittsburgh Steelers. The following week, Malone caught two receptions for 35-yards and scored his first career touchdown on a 25-yard pass from Andy Dalton during a 24–23 victory over the Indianapolis Colts.

On September 1, 2019, Malone was waived by the Bengals.

New York Jets
On September 4, 2019, Malone was signed to the New York Jets practice squad. He was promoted to the active roster on December 19, 2019.

On September 5, 2020, Malone was waived by the Jets and signed to the practice squad the next day. He was elevated to the active roster on September 12 for the team's week 1 game against the Buffalo Bills and reverted to the practice squad on September 14. He was again elevated to the active roster on September 19 for the team's week 2 game against the San Francisco 49ers and reverted to the practice squad on September 21. He was promoted to the active roster on September 22, 2020. He was waived on October 10, and re-signed to the practice squad three days later. He signed a reserve/future contract with the Jets on January 4, 2021.

On August 24, 2021, Malone was waived by the Jets.

Denver Broncos
On October 5, 2021, Malone was signed to the Denver Broncos practice squad. He was released on October 12.

Green Bay Packers
On December 14, 2021, Malone was signed to the Green Bay Packers practice squad. His contract expired when the teams season ended on January 22, 2022.

Tennessee Titans
On February 22, 2022, Malone signed with the Tennessee Titans. He was released on August 16, 2022.

Pittsburgh Steelers
On October 18, 2022, Malone signed with the Pittsburgh Steelers practice-squad. He was released on October 29, 2022. He signed back with the practice squad on November 8, 2022, then released on November 29.

DC Defenders
On February 4, 2023, Malone was signed by the DC Defenders. He was released on March 15, 2023.

Personal life
Josh is the son of Rebecca and Cordell Malone.

References

External links
Pittsburgh Steelers bio
Tennessee Volunteers biography

1996 births
Living people
People from Gallatin, Tennessee
Players of American football from Tennessee
American football wide receivers
Tennessee Volunteers football players
Cincinnati Bengals players
New York Jets players
Denver Broncos players
Green Bay Packers players
Tennessee Titans players
Pittsburgh Steelers players
DC Defenders players